The Federación de  Los Verdes–Izquierda Verde (Spanish for "Federation of The Greens–Green Left") was a political federation founded in Spain in 1999 by Confederation of The Greens, the Initiative for Catalonia Greens, and Aragonese Council for the 1999 European Parliament election.

Green political parties in Spain
European Green Party
Political parties established in 1999
1999 establishments in Spain